Rimmel (commonly known as Rimmel London) is a British multinational cosmetics brand, now owned by parent company Coty, Inc. The House of Rimmel was founded by French-born British cosmetics entrepreneur Eugène Rimmel as a perfumery 20 February 1834, in Bond Street, London. It gave rise to the term 'rimmel' being used to mean 'mascara' in many Mediterranean languages.

With creative success with these products, Rimmel London began creating products such as pomades and mouth rinses. Today, the brand is one of the world's most popular make-up producers.

Marketing and spokesmodels
Rimmel's company motto is "Live the London Look". The faces of Rimmel were Kate Moss, Sophie Ellis-Bextor, Lily Cole, Ayumi Hamasaki, and ITV's Holly Willoughby.

In October 2009, it was announced that Jerry Hall, Georgia May Jagger, and Canadian supermodel, Coco Rocha, were set to join to the line up of spokeswomen. Within days of Rocha's first campaign release, Rimmel announced that they had signed Zooey Deschanel, Solange Knowles, and Alejandra Ramos Munoz would help the brand launch into the global marketplace. In 2013, Rimmel announced their collaboration with British singer, Rita Ora, for makeup collections. In 2016, Rimmel named British model Cara Delevingne as one of the faces of their brand.

Ads featuring Moss and Jagger were banned from British magazines and television after the Advertising Standards Authority found them to be misleading as the ads used false lashes. In 2021, Rimmel announced Adwoa Aboah as the global activist for the brand. She would be the face of major beauty campaigns for the year.

International 
Rimmel products are available in pharmacies and supermarkets in Argentina, Australia, Austria, Bahrain, Belarus, Belgium, Bulgaria, Canada, China, Croatia, Czech Republic, Denmark, Estonia, Finland, France, Germany, Hungary, India, Indonesia, Ireland, Israel, Italy, Japan, Latvia, Lithuania, Lebanon, Malta, Mexico, Netherlands, Norway, Poland, Portugal, Qatar, Romania, Russia, Saudi Arabia, Slovakia, South Africa, South Korea, Spain, Turkey, Lebanon, the United Arab Emirates, the United Kingdom, Ukraine, Greece, and the United States.

References

External links

Cosmetics companies of the United Kingdom
British brands
Cosmetics brands
Coty Inc.
British companies established in 1834